Jeffrey Joseph Giuliano (born June 20, 1979 in Nashua, New Hampshire) is an American former professional ice hockey left winger who played 101 games in the National Hockey League for the Los Angeles Kings.

Playing career
As a youth, Giuliano played in the 1993 Quebec International Pee-Wee Hockey Tournament with the Connecticut Yankees minor ice hockey team.

Giuliano played high school hockey with St. Paul's School (Concord, New Hampshire). He attended Boston College where he developed a reputation for speed, play making, work ethic, reliability, ruggedness, judgment, and leadership on and off the ice.  While at Boston College his team played for the national championship twice, winning it 2001. Giuliano was elected captain of the 2002 squad.

After graduating from Boston College, Giuliano played for the Reading Royals, the ECHL affiliate of the Los Angeles Kings. He moved up quickly to the Manchester Monarchs, the Kings' AHL affiliate, where he played for several successful seasons. Giuliano made his NHL debut for the Kings during the 2005–06 NHL season and went on to play 101 games over two seasons with the team.

In 2008, Giuliano joined the Belarusian side HC Dinamo Minsk of the newly formed Kontinental Hockey League. In 2009, he joined the Iserlohn Roosters of the Deutsche Eishockey Liga (DEL).

After six seasons with the Roosters, Giuliano retired from professional hockey and returned to America to accept an assistant coaching position with the Manchester Monarchs of the ECHL on August 18, 2015.

Career statistics

References

External links

1979 births
Living people
American ice hockey coaches
Boston College Eagles men's ice hockey players
American men's ice hockey left wingers
HC Dinamo Minsk players
Iserlohn Roosters players
Los Angeles Kings players
Manchester Monarchs (AHL) players
Sportspeople from Nashua, New Hampshire
Reading Royals players
Undrafted National Hockey League players
Ice hockey people from New Hampshire
NCAA men's ice hockey national champions